Ann Lyons (born 23 November 1953) is justice of the Supreme Court of Queensland in the Trial Division. She has served on the court since 2006, and was previously a tutor and lecturer at the Queensland University of Technology Law School.

See also

List of judges of the Supreme Court of Queensland

References

Judges of the Supreme Court of Queensland
Australian women judges
University of Queensland alumni
Queensland University of Technology alumni
Living people
1953 births
People from Brisbane